ANAAR TV is a commercial television station in Kabul, Afghanistan. This channel is launched early after DDTV startup on 31 May 2015, It became one of the first digital terrestrial television (DTTV) stations dedicated to technology, and later became Afghanistan's first English language entertainment Channel. The channel was broadcast via Oqaab DTTV on channel 29, and from 17 January 2016 onward was available on Yahsat.

The channel broadcasts popular English TV series with Dari and Pashto subtitles.

As the only English entertainment and technology channel the channel often faces threats from extremists. After the 7 November 2017 attack on Shamshad TV, the management decide to suspend transmission due to threats, without prior notice.

References

External links 
 Official site

Television stations in Afghanistan
2015 in Afghanistan